Samuel Stephen Thomas Jones (born 6 September 1955) is an English former professional footballer who played as a goalkeeper.

Career
Born in Harrogate, Jones signed for Bradford City in September 1971 after playing as an apprentice, leaving the club in July 1975 to play in the Harrogate League. During his time with Bradford City he made two appearances in the Football League.

Sources

References

1955 births
Living people
English footballers
Bradford City A.F.C. players
English Football League players
Association football goalkeepers